Kakure kirishitan is a modern term for a member of the Catholic Church in Japan that went underground at the start of the Edo period in the early 17th century due to Christianity's repression by the Tokugawa shogunate.

History

Origin 

Kakure kirishitan are the Catholic communities in Japan which hid themselves during the ban and persecution of Christianity by Japan in the 1600s.

Depictions of Mary modeled on the Buddhist deity Kannon (Avalokiteśvara), goddess of mercy, became common among kakure kirishitan, and were known as "Maria Kannon". The prayers were adapted to sound like Buddhist chant, yet retained many untranslated words from Latin, Portuguese, and Spanish. The Bible and other parts of the liturgy were passed down orally, because printed works could be confiscated by authorities.

Kakure kirishitan were recognized by Bernard Petitjean, a Catholic priest, when Ōura Church was built in Nagasaki in 1865. Approximately 30,000 secret Christians, some of whom had adopted these new ways of practicing Christianity, came out of hiding when religious freedom was re-established in 1873 after the Meiji Restoration.

Lift of the ban on Christianity 
Japan's ban on Christianity was lifted in 1873.

The majority of kakure kirishitan rejoined the Catholic Church after renouncing unorthodox, syncretic practices. Some Kakure Kirishitan did not rejoin the Catholic Church, and became known as the hanare kirishitan (separated Christians). Hanare Kirishitan are now primarily found in Urakami and on the Gotō Islands.

Christal Whelan 
In the early 1990s, anthropologist Christal Whelan discovered some Hanare Kirishitans still living on the Gotō Islands where Kakure Kirishitans had once fled. There were only two surviving priests on the islands, both of whom were over 90, and they would not talk to each other. The few surviving laity had also reached old age, and some of them no longer had any priests from their lineage and prayed alone. Although these Hanare Kirishitans had a strong tradition of secrecy, they agreed to be filmed for Whelan's documentary Otaiya.

Contemporary situation 
The Kakure Kirishitan still exist today, forming "what is arguably a separate faith, barely recognizable as the creed imported in the mid-1500s by Catholic missionaries".

See also
 Haibutsu kishaku
 Shinbutsu bunri
 Shinbutsu kakuri
 Shimabara Rebellion
 Hidden Christian Sites in the Nagasaki Region
 Kakure nenbutsu, a form of Jōdo Shinshū Buddhism secretly practiced on the Japanese island of Kyushu, during a period of religious persecution from 1555 to the Meiji Restoration.
 Inquisition
 Mozarabs
 Marrano/Anusim/Converso – comparable group of hidden Jews in Spain and Portugal
 Nagasaki Prefecture

References

Further reading
"Japan – Hidden Christians": Foreign Correspondent documentary
.
.
.
Orasho, "Website of Churches and Christian Historical and Cultural Heritage of Nagasaki", operated for the Nagasaki Prefecture.
Hidden Christian Sites in the Nagasaki Region, Nagasaki Prefectural World Heritage Division
  Includes a descendant of the Kakure Kirishitan reciting the Orasho.

Catholicism in Japan
Crypto-Christianity
Edo period
History of Christianity in Japan
Passing (sociology)